American rock band All Time Low has released nine studio albums, six EPs, two live albums, twenty-nine singles and thirty-nine music videos.

Beginning as a high school band in 2003, All Time Low released their debut EP The Three Words to Remember in Dealing with the End EP in 2004 through local label Emerald Moon Records, and their first studio album The Party Scene in 2005. While on tour with other bands, they caught the attention of Hopeless Records and signed to them, releasing the Put Up or Shut Up EP in 2006 which reached number 20 on the US Billboard Independent Albums chart. All Time Low's second studio album, So Wrong, It's Right came out in 2007 and became an underground success. Despite never entering the charts or attaining commercial radio play, the album's second single "Dear Maria, Count Me In" was certified three-times platinum in 2023 by the Recording Industry Association of America for shipments of 3,000,000 copies.

Nothing Personal was released as the band's third studio album, debuting at number four on the US Billboard 200 and exceeding commercial expectations with 63,000 sales in its first week. The lead single, "Weightless", peaked at number four on the US Billboard Bubbling Under Hot 100 chart, with the follow-up single, "Damned If I Do Ya (Damned If I Don't)", becoming the band's first appearance on the Billboard Hot 100 at number 67.

All Time Low released their first live album, Straight to DVD, in 2010. During the recording of All Time Low's fourth studio album, the band contributed the song "Painting Flowers" to the Almost Alice soundtrack. "Painting Flowers" debuted and peaked at number five on the Bubbling Under Hot 100 chart. Dirty Work was released the band's fourth album in 2011 as the band's major label debut on Interscope Records. It debuted and peaked at number six on the Billboard 200 with 45,000 first-week sales. Its lead single "I Feel Like Dancin'" reached number 13 on the Bubbling Under Hot 100 chart and number 39 on the Pop Songs chart. All Time Low announced their departure from Interscope in May 2012, and uploaded "The Reckless and the Brave" on their website as a free download.

In July 2012, All Time Low returned to Hopeless Records and released their fifth studio album on October 9, Don't Panic. The album was re-released as a deluxe edition on September 30, 2013 under the revised title, Don't Panic: It's Longer Now!. The single "A Love Like War" is exclusive to the re-release and features guest vocals by Vic Fuentes of Pierce the Veil. It reached number 23 on the Bubbling Under Hot 100 chart and number 17 on the Rock Songs chart, becoming the band's first single to chart in the US since "Time-Bomb" in 2011.

All Time Low's 2017 song "Good Times" became the band's most successful single on radio to date, peaking at number 13 on the Adult Pop Songs chart. It was later surpassed by their 2020 single "Monsters", which peaked at number one on the Alternative Songs chart, remaining there for 18 weeks. It made an appearance on the Billboard Hot 100, peaking at No. 55, their first entry in a decade.

Albums

Studio albums

Re-recordings

Live albums

Extended plays

Singles

Promotional singles

Other charted songs

Music videos

Compilation appearances

See also
 List of songs recorded by All Time Low

Notes

References

Discographies of American artists
Pop punk group discographies